Szewska Street (Polish: Ulica Szewska, lit. Shoemakers Street) - a historic street in Kraków, Poland. The street begins at the Main Square from which it heads west, where it adjoins Podwale Street. Formerly, where Szewska met with Podwale Street stood the former suburb of Garbary with gristmills and royal fulling houses. Most of the street's buildings were built between the fourteenth and seventeenth-century. Szewska Street was part of the former Silesian Route (heading towards Bytom). The street continues west as Karmelicka Street (Ulica Karmelicka, lit. Carmelites Street).

Features

References

Streets in Kraków